iQor is a business process outsourcing company which provides customer service, third-party collections and accounts receivable management. Although its headquarters are located in St. Petersburg, Florida, the company operates about 40 call centers in North America, Europe, and Asia. Since 2014, iQor has shifted to an end-to-end customer support organization, when iQor acquired the aftermarket services division of Jabil Circuit (rebranded as iQor's Product Support division). Services provided vary from consumer electronics, to medical devices.

History 
In January 2004, Vikas Kapoor became the CEO and President of iQor. Kapoor built the company's computing platforms, developer tools, and cloud computing services. iQor’s employee base grew from 4,000 to 14,000. This success led InformationWeek magazine to rank iQor #27 among the top technology innovators in the US.

Investigations 
In 2012, a CBC news investigation found that iQor routinely and sometimes knowingly repeatedly contacted people who did not owe debt in Canada. The investigation noted that in 2012, two Canadian provinces had fined iQor for violating provincial regulations. In 2010, Allied Interstate, a subsidiary of iQor, was fined $1.75 million by the Federal Trade Commission for harassing debtors and trying to collect from the wrong people.

Ownership 
iQor is privately owned by Huntsman Gay Global Capital and the company's management team. In 2010, iQor acquired RMS which was headquartered in Bethlehem, Pennsylvania.

References

External links 
 
 ARM and Call Center Firm, IRMC, Becomes iQor

Call centre companies
Outsourcing companies
Companies based in Florida